Max Reinhardt (born Maximilian Goldmann; 9 September 1873 – 30 October 1943) was an Austrian-born theatre and film director, intendant, and theatrical producer. With his innovative stage productions, he is regarded as one of the most prominent directors of German-language theatre in the early 20th century. In 1920, he established the Salzburg Festival with the performance of Hugo von Hofmannsthal's Jedermann.

Life and career

Reinhardt was born Maximilian Goldmann in the spa town of Baden near Vienna, the son of Wilhelm Goldmann (1846–1911), a Jewish merchant from Stupava, Austro-Hungarian Monarchy]], and his wife Rachel Lea Rosi "Rosa" Goldmann (née Wengraf; 1851–1924). Having finished school, he began an apprenticeship at a bank, but already took acting lessons. In 1890, he gave his debut on a private stage in Vienna with the stage name Max Reinhardt (possibly after the protagonist Reinhard Werner in Theodor Storm's novella Immensee). In 1893 he performed at the re-opened Salzburg City Theatre. One year later, Reinhardt relocated to Germany, joining the Deutsches Theater ensemble under director Otto Brahm in Berlin.  

In 1918 Reinhardt purchased Schloss Leopoldskron castle in Salzburg, which had fallen into disrepair. While living in it for nearly 20 years, he painstakingly restored the castle; however he fled due to the Nazis' increasing anti-Semitic aggressions. The castle was seized following Germany's Anschluss annexation of Austria in 1938. After the war, the castle was restored to Reinhardt's heirs, and subsequently the home and grounds became famous as the filming site for the early scenes of the Von Trapp family gardens in the movie The Sound of Music.

Reinhardt theatres
In 1901, Reinhardt together with Friedrich Kayßler and several other theatre colleagues founded the Schall und Rauch (Sound and Smoke) Kabarett stage in Berlin. Re-opened as Kleines Theater (Little Theatre) it was the first of numerous stages where Reinhardt worked as a director until the beginning of Nazi rule in 1933. From 1903 to 1905, he managed the Neues Theater (present-day Theater am Schiffbauerdamm) and in 1906 acquired the Deutsches Theater in Berlin. In 1911, he premiered with Karl Vollmöller's The Miracle in Olympia, London, gaining an international reputation.

In 1910, Siegfried Jacobsohn wrote his book entitled Max Reinhardt. In 1914, he was persuaded to sign the Manifesto of the Ninety-Three, defending the German invasion of Belgium. He was signatory 66; he later expressed regret at signing.

From 1915 to 1918, Reinhardt also worked as director of the Volksbühne theatre and after World War I re-opened the Großes Schauspielhaus (after World War II renamed into Friedrichstadtpalast) in 1919, following its expressionist conversion by Hans Poelzig. By 1930, he ran eleven stages in Berlin and, in addition, managed the Theater in der Josefstadt in Vienna from 1924 to 1933. In 1920, Reinhardt established the Salzburg Festival with Richard Strauss and Hugo von Hofmannsthal, notably directing an annual production of the morality play Jedermann in which God sends Death to summon a representative of mankind for judgment. In the United States, he successfully directed The Miracle in 1924, and a popular stage version of Shakespeare's A Midsummer Night's Dream in 1927.

Reinhardt followed that success by directing a film version of A Midsummer Night's Dream in 1935 using a mostly different cast, that included James Cagney, Mickey Rooney, Joe E. Brown and Olivia de Havilland, amongst others. Mickey Rooney and Olivia de Havilland had also appeared in Reinhardt's 1934 stage production, which was staged at the Hollywood Bowl. The Nazis banned the film because of the Jewish ancestry of both Reinhardt and Felix Mendelssohn, whose music (arranged by Erich Wolfgang Korngold) was used throughout the film.

After the Anschluss of Austria to Nazi-governed Germany in 1938, he emigrated first to Britain, then to the United States.
Reinhardt opened the Reinhardt School of the Theatre in Hollywood, on Sunset Boulevard. Several notable stars of the day received classical theater training, among them actress Nanette Fabray. In 1940, he became a naturalized citizen of the United States. At that time, he was married to his second wife, actress Helene Thimig, daughter of actor Hugo Thimig.

By employing powerful staging techniques, and integrating stage design, language, music and choreography, Reinhardt introduced new dimensions into German theatre. The Max Reinhardt Seminar in Vienna, which is arguably the most important German-language acting school, was installed implementing his ideas.

Max Reinhardt and film

Reinhardt took a greater interest in film than most of his contemporaries in the theater world. He made films as a director and from time to time also as a producer. His first staging was the film Sumurûn in 1910. After that, Reinhardt founded his own film company. He sold the film rights for the film adaptation of the play Das Mirakel (The Miracle) to Joseph Menchen, whose full-colour 1912 film of The Miracle gained world-wide success. Controversies around the staging of Das Mirakel, which was shown in the Vienna Rotunde in 1912, led to Reinhardt's retreat from the project. The author of the play, Reinhardt's friend and confidant Karl Gustav Vollmoeller, had French director Michel Carré finish the shooting. 

Reinhardt made two films, Die Insel der Seligen (Isle of the Blessed) and Eine venezianische Nacht (Venetian Nights), under a four-picture contract for the German film producer Paul Davidson. Released in 1913 and 1914, respectively, both films received negative reviews from the press and public. The other two films called for in the contract were never made.

Both films demanded much of cameraman Karl Freund because of Reinhardt's special shooting needs, such as filming a lagoon in moonlight. Isle of the Blessed attracted attention due to its erotic nature. Its ancient mythical setting included sea gods, nymphs, and fauns, and the actors appeared naked. However, the film also fit in with the strict customs of the late German and Austrian empires. The actors had to live up to the demands of double roles. Wilhelm Diegelmann and Willy Prager played the bourgeois fathers as well as the sea gods,  a bachelor and a faun, Leopoldine Konstantin the Circe. The shooting for Eine venezianische Nacht by Karl Gustav Vollmoeller took place in Venice. Maria Carmi played the bride, Alfred Abel the young stranger, and Ernst Matray Anselmus and Pipistrello. The shooting was disturbed by a fanatic who incited the attendant Venetians against the German-speaking staff.

In 1935, Reinhardt directed his first film in the US, A Midsummer Night's Dream. He founded the drama schools Hochschule für Schauspielkunst "Ernst Busch" in Berlin and the Max Reinhardt Seminar. Many alumni of these schools made their careers in film.

Death and legacy

Reinhardt died of a stroke in New York City in 1943 and is interred at Westchester Hills Cemetery in Hastings-on-Hudson, Westchester County, New York. He was 70 years old. His papers and literary estate are housed at Binghamton University (SUNY), in the Max Reinhardt Archives and Library.
His sons by first wife Else Heims (m. 1910–1935), Wolfgang and Gottfried Reinhardt, were well-regarded film producers. One of his grandsons (by adoption), Stephen Reinhardt, was a labor lawyer who served notably on the United States Court of Appeals for the Ninth Circuit from his appointment by Jimmy Carter in 1980 until his death in 2018. Another grandson, Michael Reinhardt, is a successful fashion photographer. In 2015 his great-granddaughter Jelena Ulrike Reinhardt was appointed as researcher at the University of Perugia in German literature.

Tribute
On 18 November 2015, the Friedrichstadt-Palast in Berlin inaugurated a memorial at Friedrichstraße 107 dedicated to the theatre's founders, Max Reinhardt, Hans Poelzig and Erik Charell.

Work on Broadway
 Sumurun (pantomime) (1912) – leader of the Deutsches Theater of Berlin on a New York tour
 The Miracle (1924) – Co-playwright and director
 A Midsummer Night's Dream (revival) (1927) – Producer
 Jedermann (1927) – Co-producer
 Peripherie (1928) – Playwright
 Redemption (revival) (1928) – Director
 The Eternal Road (1937) – Director
 The Merchant of Yonkers (1938), Thornton Wilder's play, later rewritten as The Matchmaker
 Sons and Soldiers (1943) – Producer and director

Films
 A Midsummer Night's Dream (1935)

See also 

 The Continental Players, co-founded by Reinhardt

References

External links

 Max Reinhardt Archives and Library  at Binghamton University, State University of New York
 
 
 A hard-nosed Utopian By Esther Slevogt at signandsight.com
 Michael Frayn's play Afterlife, based on Reinhardt's life: National Theatre, London (2008) 
 Literature on Max Reinhardt
 Max Reinhardt Facts 
 

1873 births
1943 deaths
Jewish emigrants from Austria to the United States after the Anschluss
American opera directors
American theatre directors
Austrian opera directors
Austrian theatre directors
Burials at Westchester Hills Cemetery
Ernst Busch Academy of Dramatic Arts
Jewish American male actors
Jewish Austrian male actors
People from Baden bei Wien
Salzburg Festival directors
Jewish theatre directors